Pass of Kilbride is a civil parish in County Westmeath, Ireland.

Pass of Kilbride is one of 10 civil parishes in the barony of Fartullagh in the Province of Leinster.

Pass of Kilbride civil parish comprises the village of Milltownpass and 5 townlands: Corcloon, Drumman, Gallstown, Milltown and Pass of Kilbride.

An Abbey stands outside the village of Milltownpass, known locally as Pass of Kilbride Abbey.

The neighbouring civil parishes are: Enniscoffey to the north, Killucan (barony of Farbill), Ballyboggan (County Meath) and Castlejordan (County Meath) to the east, Castlelost to the south and Kilbride to the west.

References

External links
Pass of Kilbride civil parish at the IreAtlas Townland Data Base
Pass of Kilbride civil parish at Townlands.ie
Pass of Kilbride civil parish at the Placenames Database of Ireland

Civil parishes of County Westmeath